Rychansky is a rural locality (a settlement) in Akhmatovsky Selsoviet, Narimanovsky District, Astrakhan Oblast, Russia. The population was 237 as of 2010. There are 14 streets.

Geography 
Rychansky is located 63 km southeast of Narimanov (the district's administrative centre) by road. Rastopulovka is the nearest rural locality.

References 

Rural localities in Narimanovsky District